Fatehpur, Fatepur, or Phattepur may refer to any of a number of places:

Bangladesh 
 Fatehpur Union (Hathazari),  a union of Hathazari Upazila of Chittagong District

India 

Fatehpur, Bihar, a village
Fatehpur, Bhopal, a village in Madhya Pradesh
Fatehpur, Gujarat, a village in Amreli district
Fatehpur, Rajasthan, a town
Fatehpur (community development block), an administrative division in Jharkhand
Fatehpur, Jamtara, a village in Jharkhand

West Bengal
Fatehpur, Birbhum, a census town in Birbhum district
Fatepur, Falta, a census town in South 24 Parganas district

Haryana 

Fatehpur, Kaithal, a village in Kaithal district
Fatehpur, Yamunanagar, a village in Yamuna Nagar district

Punjab 

Fatehpur, Bhulath, a village
Fatehpur, Jalandhar, a village
Fatehpur, Kapurthala, a village in Kapurthala district

Uttar Pradesh 

Fatehpur district
Fatehpur, Barabanki, a city
Fatehpur, Uttar Pradesh, a city in Fatehpur district
Fatehpur railway station, on the Howrah–Delhi main line in Uttar Pradesh, India
 Fatehpur, Raebareli, a village in Raebareli district

Constituencies 

 Fatehpur (Vidhan Sabha constituency), in Himachal Pradesh, India
 Fatehpur (Rajasthan Assembly constituency)
 Fatehpur, Uttar Pradesh (Assembly constituency)
 Fatehpur (Lok Sabha constituency), in Uttar Pradesh, India

Nepal 

 Phattepur, Saptari, a village development committee in Saptari District

Pakistan 

Fatehpur (Gujrat), a village in Punjab
Fatehpur (Kashmir), a town in Azad Kashmir
Fatehpur (Kasur), a town and union council in Punjab
Fatehpur, Swat, a union council in Khyber Pakhtunkhwa

Other uses 

 Fateh Pur, a city in Punjab, Pakistan
 Fatehpur Sikri, in Agra district, India, a former capital of the Mughal Empire